Sven Rudolf Sidenius Gyldmark (21 April 1904 – 5 October 1981) was a Danish film score composer.
He was the brother of Hugo Gyldmark and Leonard who were also composers.

Filmography 

  (1975)
 Nøddebo Præstegård (1974)
  (1973)
  (1972)
 Min søsters børn når de er værst (1971)
  (1971)
 Guld til præriens skrappe drenge (1971)
 Hurra for de blå husarer (1970)
  (1970)
 Præriens skrappe drenge (1970)
  (1969)
 Mig og min lillebror og Bølle (1969)
 Pigen fra Egborg (1969)
 Sjov i gaden (1969)
  (1969)
 Dyrlægens plejebørn (1968)
  (1968)
 Mig og min lillebror og storsmuglerne (1968)
 Min søsters børn vælter byen (1968)
 Soldaterkammerater på bjørnetjeneste (1968)
 Brødrene på Uglegården (1967)
 The Reluctant Sadist (1967)
 Mig og min lillebror (1967)
  (1967)
 Nyhavns glade gutter (1967)
 Dyden går amok (1966)
 Krybskytterne på Næsbygaard (1966)
 Min søsters børn (1966)
  (1965)
 En ven i bolignøden (1965)
 Jeg – en kvinde (1965)
  (1965)
 Næsbygaards arving (1965)
 Passer passer piger (1965)
 Kampen om Næsbygaard (1964)
  (1964)
 Sikke'n familie (1963)
 Støv for alle pengene (1963)
 Det stod i avisen (1962)
 Det støver stadig (1962)
 Der brænder en ild (1962)
 Han, hun, Dirch og Dario (1962)
 Lykkens musikanter (1962)
 Rikki og mændene (1962)
 Venus fra Vestø (1962)
  (1961)
 Far til fire med fuld musik (1961)
  (1961)
  (1961)
 Peters baby (1961)
 Reptilicus (1961)
 Støv på hjernen (1961)
 Baronessen fra benzintanken (1960)
 Det skete på Møllegården (1960)
 Elefanter på loftet (1960)
  (1960)
 Sømand i knibe (1960)
 Charles' tante (1959)
 De sjove år (1959)
 Far til fire på Bornholm (1959)
 Onkel Bill fra New York (1959)
 Vi er allesammen tossede (1959)
 Far til fire og ulveungerne (1958)
  (1958)
  (1958)
 Styrmand Karlsen (1958)
 Vagabonderne på Bakkegården (1958)
 Verdens rigeste pige (1958)
  (1957)
 Bundfald (1957)
  (1957)
 Far til fire og onkel Sofus (1957)
  (1957)
 Tag til marked i Fjordby (1957)
  (1957)
 Far til fire i byen (1956)
 Flintesønnerne (1956)
 Færgekroen (1956)
  (1956)
 Taxa K-1640 Efterlyses (1956)
  (1956)
 Altid ballade (1955)
 Der kom en dag (1955)
 Det var paa Rundetaarn (1955)
 Far til fire på landet (1955)
  (1955)
  (1955)
 Arvingen (1954)
 En sømand går i land (1954)
 Far til fire i sneen (1954)
 Hendes store aften (1954)
 I kongens klæ'r (1954)
 The Old Mill on Mols (1953)
 Far til fire (1953)
 Farlig ungdom (1953)
 Fløjtespilleren (1953)
 Ved Kongelunden (1953)
  (1952)
 Det store løb (1952)
 Husmandstøsen (1952)
 Rekrut 67 Petersen (1952)
 Vejrhanen (1952)
  (1951)
 Det gamle guld (1951)
 Det sande ansigt (1951)
 Dorte (1951)
 Fodboldpræsten (1951)
  (1951)
 Café Paradis (1950)
 De røde heste (1950)
 Den opvakte jomfru (1950)
  (1950)
 Mosekongen (1950)
  (1949)
 Det gælder os alle (1949)
 Vi vil ha' et barn (1949)
 Hr. Petit (1948)
 Støt står den danske sømand (1948)
 The Swedenhielm Family (1947)
 Lise kommer til byen (1947)
  (1947)
  (1946)
 Jeg elsker en anden (1946)
 Så mødes vi hos Tove (1946)
 Affæren Birte (1945)
 De kloge og vi gale (1945)
 De røde enge (1945)
 Panik i familien (1945)
 Elly Petersen (1944)
  (1944)
 Teatertosset (1944)
 Det brændende spørgsmål (1943)
  (1943)
  (1943)
 Hans onsdagsveninde (1943)
  (1943)
 Afsporet (1942)
 Frøken Vildkat (1942)
  (1942)
  (1942)
 Tyrannens fald (1942)
  (1937)

See also 
 List of Danish composers

External links 
 Det Danske Filmmusik Selskab (DFS)

References 
 This article was initially translated from the Danish Wikipedia.

1904 births
1981 deaths
20th-century Danish composers
Bodil Honorary Award recipients
Danish film score composers
People from Copenhagen